Ananda Lakshman Wijemanna (born 19 June 1960) is a Sri Lankan politician and a member of the Parliament of Sri Lanka. He represents Kalutara District and he is the district leader and organiser of United National Party.

References

External links
Official Parliament Profile

Living people
1960 births
Members of the 12th Parliament of Sri Lanka
Members of the 13th Parliament of Sri Lanka
Members of the 15th Parliament of Sri Lanka